Fredmans sånger (in English, Fredman's Songs or Songs of Fredman) is a collection of 65 poems and songs published in 1791 by the Swedish poet Carl Michael Bellman.

As a follow-up to Fredmans epistlar from the previous year, the book contains songs from a longer period. There are bible travesties ("Gubben Noak", "Gubben Loth och hans gamla Fru", "Joachim uti Babylon"), drinking songs ("Bacchi Proclama", "Til buteljen"), rococo pastorales (Opp Amaryllis!), and lyrical passages ("Fjäriln vingad syns på Haga").

Several of these songs including Gubben Noak and Fjäriln vingad are known by heart by many Swedes.

Grouping of the songs

Bellman had public performances known as the Bacchi orden ("Order of Bacchus"). These consisted largely of travesties of the chivalric and society orders of the time, some of which Bellman himself was a member. These orders held strict ceremonials, and members were often expected to live a decent and "christian life". To be knighted in the Order of Bacchus, the candidate had to have been observed publicly lying in a stupor in the gutter, at least twice. Several of the songs from these performances are collected in Songs of Fredman (songs 1–6).

Songs 18–21 are about death.

Bellman wrote drinking songs and bible travesties, and also mixed the two genres. The holy men from the Old Testament were portrayed as drunks. The travesties became popular all over the country, being spread (anonymously) by broadsheets and transcripts. Some of Bellman's bible travesties offended the church authorities. As shown in a 1768 letter from the Lund chapter, the church attempted to collect all prints and transcripts in circulation of the most popular song, "Gubben Noak", as well as other songs. It and eight other biblical travesties are songs 35–43.

Songs 47–54 are part of a song play about "Bacchus's bankruptcy" (Bacchi konkurs). The other songs in the book are not naturally grouped by theme.

Songs

Persons
The songs portray a series of persons, mostly people lapsed into heavy drinking. Named persons are Kolmodin (treasurer), Holmström, Nystedt (pub owner), Meissner (brewer), Steindecker (royal kettledrummer), Lundholm (brewer and distiller), Appelstubbe (customs officer), Österman (workshop owner), Halling (baker), Agrell (customs officer), Kämpendal, Nybom, Planberg, Joseph Israelson (student and poet) and Knapen (musician). In addition to these are the biblical figures such as Adam and Susanna; and the characters from classical mythology Bacchus and Venus, plus a few more.

References

External links

 Facsimile of 1791 book

 
Swedish poetry
1791 books
Song books
Works by Carl Michael Bellman